is a railway station in the city of  Uozu, Toyama, Japan, operated by the private railway operator Toyama Chihō Railway.

Lines

Station layout 
The station has two opposed ground-level side platforms  connected to the wooden station building by a level crossing. The station is unattended.

History
Nishi-Uozu Station was opened on 5 June 1936.

Adjacent stations

Surrounding area 
 Uozu Aquarium
Sumiyoshi Elementary School

See also
 List of railway stations in Japan

References

External links

 

Railway stations in Toyama Prefecture
Railway stations in Japan opened in 1936
Stations of Toyama Chihō Railway
Uozu, Toyama